The Billboard Tropical Songs is a chart that ranks the best-performing tropical songs of the United States. Published by Billboard magazine, the data are compiled by Nielsen Broadcast Data Systems based collectively on each single's weekly airplay.

Chart history

See also
 List of number-one Billboard Tropical Songs of 2011
 List of number-one Billboard Tropical Songs of 2013
 List of number-one Billboard Top Latin Songs of 2012
 List of number-one Billboard Hot Latin Pop Airplay of 2012

References

United States Tropical Songs
2012
2012 in Latin music